Mangala may be:
Mangarla language (Australia)
Mangala language (Bantu)